Yazıkonak (former Vertetil, meaning " rose garden") is a belde (town) in the central district (Elazığ District) of Elazığ Province, Turkey. It is situated to the west of Keban Dam reservoir. Its population is 9,606 (2021). The town is a relatively new settlement. Elazığ Airport which is just at the southwest of Yazıkonak contributed to the rapid increase in population. In 1986, it was declared a seat of township. Agriculture, cattle rising and light industries are among the economic activities of the town. The town is populated by Kurds with a Turkish minority.

References

Populated places in Elazığ Province
Towns in Turkey
Elazığ District
Kurdish settlements in Elazığ Province